Princess Pea is an anonymous Gurgaon based visual and performance artist. Identified by her large anime head, she pops up at various public places and events such as art fairs, asking questions to the society about identity and self-worth.

Collaborations 
She broke into the art scene in 2009 with her solo at the India Art Fair.

In 2016 at the India Art Fair, she launched a limited edition of Etikopakka toys, made using soft wood and lacquer colour in the village of Etikoppaka.

Fashion brand Pero by fashion designer Aneeth Arora collaborated with the artist in AIFW 2015. The association highlights the alter ego by creating Princess Pea costumes. She walked the ramp for the Lakme Fashion Week (summer/resort 2018).

Vague series by Princess Pea brings out digitally manipulated magazine covers in a satirical attempt.

Proxies by Princess Pea, in collaboration with Architectural Digest (Art Issue 2017) were a three-act play of performing life.

Footnotes 

Indian contemporary artists
Indian performance artists
Living people
Year of birth missing (living people)